UGAFODE Microfinance Limited, commonly called UGAFODE, is a microfinance deposit-accepting institution (MDI) in Uganda. It is licensed and supervised by the Bank of Uganda, the central bank and national banking regulator.

Location
The headquarters of UGAFODE are located at 62 Silva Arcade, Bombo Road in the central business district of Kampala, Uganda's capital and largest city. The coordinates of UGAFODE headquarters are:0°19'42.0"N, 32°34'26.0"E (Latitude:0.328322; Longitude:32.573889).

Overview
UGAFODE was the fourth MDI in Uganda. An application was made to the Bank of Uganda for the issuance of an MDI banking license. In October 2011, a Tier III MDI licence was granted, and MDI operations began on 10 October 2011.

As of March 2014, the institution's total assets were about US$10.07 million (UGX:25.34 billion), with shareholders' equity of about US$2.25 million (UGX:5.66 billion).

History
UGAFODE was founded in 1994 as the Uganda Agency for Development Limited, a non-governmental organization whose primary objective was to provide affordable financial services to its customers. In September 2010, in preparation to become an MDI, UGAFODE Microfinance Limited was incorporated as a limited company.

In 2011, the institution accepted eight new shareholders, including Ezra Suruma, Uganda minister of finance from 2005 until 2009 and senior adviser for finance and planning to the President of Uganda. Suruma also had an ownership interest in the National Bank of Commerce (Uganda), a Tier I commercial bank, which was closed in 2012.

Branch network
As of December 2013, the institution maintained branches at the following locations, arranged alphabetically:

 Bombo Road Branch - Silva Arcade, 62 Bombo Road, Kampala Main Branch
 Ibanda Branch - Adam's Building, Main Street, Ibanda
 Ishaka Branch - 33 Rukungiri Road, Ishaka
 Kagadi Branch - 241-242 Isunga Road, Kagadi
 Kyotera Branch - 184-753 Mutukula Road, Kyotera
 Lira Branch - Plot 8A, Soroti Road, Lira
 Lyantonde Branch - 215-76 Main Street, Lyantonde
 Mbarara Branch - 23 Bananuka Drive, Mbarara
 Mpigi Branch - Continental House, Mpigi
 Nkrumah Road Branch - 11/13 Nkrumah Road, Kampala
 Ntungamo Branch - 69A Kabale Road, Ntungamo
 Rubaga Road Branch - 22 Namirembe Road, Kampala
 Rukungiri Branch - 5 Rubabo Road, Rukungiri
 Lira Branch - Plot 8A Soroti Road, Lira, Lira
 Nakivale Refugees settlement Branch, Isingiro

See also
 Banking in Uganda
 List of banks in Uganda
 Pride Microfinance Limited
 FINCA Uganda Limited
 Finance Trust Bank

References

External links
 List of Financial Institutions Supervised By Bank of Uganda
UGAFODE Microfinance Limited Homepage

Banks of Uganda
Banks established in 1994
1994 establishments in Uganda
Companies based in Kampala